The men's team in table tennis at the 2015 European Games in Baku was the 1st edition of the event in a European Games It was held at Baku Crystal Hall from 13 to 15 June 2015.

Main Draw

First round

Quarterfinals

Semifinals

Bronze Medal

Gold Medal

External links
 
 

Men's team